Åsbo Northern Hundred was a hundred in Skåne in Sweden. Until the Treaty of Roskilde in 1658, it was Danish.

See also
Åsbo Southern Hundred in Skåne
List of hundreds of Sweden

Subdivisions of Sweden